Dick Crum (born April 29, 1934) is a former American football player and coach. He served as head coach at Miami University (1974–1977), the University of North Carolina at Chapel Hill (1978–1987), and Kent State University (1988–1990), compiling a career college football record of 113–77–4. Crum is a 1957 graduate of Mount Union College in Alliance, Ohio and received a master's degree from Case Western Reserve University.

Early years
Crum played football, mostly as a backup, at both Muskingum College and Mount Union College before graduating from the latter in 1957. After graduation, Crum was a teacher and assistant football coach at several high schools in Ohio, including Boardman, Sandusky, and Warren Harding. Crum's first head coaching job was at Mentor High School in 1963 where he compiled a 50–9–1 record over six years. He moved to the college ranks in 1969 when he was hired as an assistant coach by Bill Mallory at Miami University.

College head coach

Miami of Ohio
When Mallory left for Colorado in 1974, Crum succeeded him as head coach at Miami, a post he held until 1977. He orchestrated several upset wins including victories over Kentucky in 1974, Purdue in 1975, and Indiana in 1977. Crum had three winning seasons in four years and won the Mid-American Conference three times. In his first two years, he led the Miami to the Tangerine Bowl twice, where they beat Georgia in 1974 and South Carolina in 1975. Those two Miami teams ranked in the final AP Poll at No. 10 in 1974 and No. 12 in 1975. In 1976, Miami's performance fell dramatically with a 3–8 finish. The team rebounded the next year with a 10–1 record. After the 1977 season, Crum accepted the head coaching position at North Carolina and was replaced by Tom Reed. During his four years at Miami, Crum developed future NFL standouts Rob Carpenter and Sherman Smith, future Miami and Northwestern head coach Randy Walker, and former Illinois head coach Ron Zook. Crum finished his stint at Miami with a record of 34–10–1.

North Carolina
Crum was hired as head coach at the University of North Carolina at Chapel Hill in 1978, succeeding Bill Dooley. His finest season there came in 1980 when he led the Tar Heels to the Atlantic Coast Conference championship—their last conference title to date—and an 11–1 record capped by victory over Texas in the Bluebonnet Bowl. At North Carolina, Crum coached a number of future NFL players years including Lawrence Taylor, Harris Barton, Reuben Davis and Kelvin Bryant.

Crum's later North Carolina teams were not quite as talented as his earlier ones; after 1983 he would have only one winning season. He was fired at the end of the 1987 season and was succeeded by Mack Brown. Crum finished his career at North Carolina with a record of 72–41–3, though he only won 22 games in his final four seasons. He was the winningest coach in school history until Mack Brown (in his second tenure at North Carolina) surpassed him after a game against Duke in 2019.

Kent State
Crum served as the head coach at Kent State University from 1988 to 1990. He never put together a winning season in three years with the Golden Flashes and compiled a record of 7–26.

Head coaching record

College

References

1934 births
Living people
Kent State Golden Flashes football coaches
Miami RedHawks football coaches
Mount Union Purple Raiders football players
Muskingum Fighting Muskies football players
North Carolina Tar Heels football coaches
High school football coaches in Ohio
Case Western Reserve University alumni